Wólka Pietkowska  is a village in the administrative district of Gmina Wyszki, within Bielsk County, Podlaskie Voivodeship, in north-eastern Poland.

References

Villages in Bielsk County